Emily Echols (born December 25, 1988) was a lead plaintiff witness in the United States Supreme Court case McConnell v. Federal Election Commission, attracting nationwide attention.  Although the Supreme Court ultimately upheld most of what was being challenged in the McCain-Feingold Act, the bill's stipulation of a ban on donations by those under 18 years of age was struck down.

Notes

External links
Echols' court declaration

1988 births
Living people